Machineries of Empire is a trilogy of military science fiction/science fantasy/space opera novels by American writer Yoon Ha Lee and published by Solaris Books. It consists of Ninefox Gambit (2016), Raven Stratagem (2017) and Revenant Gun (2018). The trilogy follows the young infantry captain Kel Cheris and the traitorous general Shuos Jedao in a war among factions of a despotic interstellar empire, the Hexarchate, whose esoteric technology is based on the population's adherence to the imperial calendar.

The novels cover "space opera, fantasy, Korean folklore and mathematics" themes. Several of Lee's short stories are prequels to the trilogy.

Novels
Ninefox Gambit, Solaris, 14 June 2016, 
Raven Stratagem, Solaris, 13 June 2017, 
Revenant Gun, Solaris, 12 June 2018,

Reception
Ninefox Gambit received the 2017 Locus Award for Best First Novel, and was nominated for the 2016 Nebula and 2017 Hugo Awards for Best Novel, and the 2017 Clarke award. Raven Stratagem was nominated for the 2018 Hugo Award for Best Novel. Revenant Gun was nominated for the 2019 Hugo Award for Best Novel.

References

Novel series
American novel series
Space opera novels
Military science fiction novels
Solaris Books books